William Fennex (born c.1764 at Gerrards Cross, Buckinghamshire; died 4 March 1838 at Stepney, London) was a famous English cricketer.  He was a noted all-rounder and right-arm underarm fast bowler who played major cricket from 1786 to 1816.

As a batsman, Fennex was reputed to be one of the first to use forward play and was said to be a good driver of the ball. As a bowler, at a time when only underarm bowling was permitted, he was said to have the highest delivery of anybody, "his hand, when propelling the ball, being nearly on a level with his shoulder".

He began his working life as a blacksmith, and stood five feet ten inches tall, "muscular and abstemious". His playing career began with Berkshire in 1785 but he was chiefly associated with Middlesex and was keeper of the ground at Uxbridge.  He made 85 known first-class appearances until 1800 and then played occasionally, making nine more appearances from 1802 to 1816. He played for the Players in the inaugural Gentlemen v Players match in 1806.

He kept the Portman Arms inn at Marylebone for a time, and in old age was employed as a gardener and groundsman. Like William Beldham, he provided James Pycroft with his reminiscences.

References

Sources
 
 
 

1764 births
1838 deaths
People from Gerrards Cross
English cricketers
Middlesex cricketers
English cricketers of 1701 to 1786
English cricketers of 1787 to 1825
Players cricketers
Kent cricketers
Marylebone Cricket Club cricketers
Hampshire cricketers
Surrey cricketers
Left-Handed v Right-Handed cricketers
Essex cricketers
R. Leigh's XI cricketers
Old Westminsters cricketers
Lord Yarmouth's XI cricketers
Colonel C. Lennox's XI cricketers